Geoffrey Alan Pike (born 28 September 1956) is an English former footballer who played as a midfielder. He spent the majority of his career at West Ham United.

Pike played his early football in Thurrock and later with Gidea Park Rangers. He joined West Ham United in 1974 and was a member of the side that reached the 1975 FA Youth Cup Final. He made his league debut on 6 March 1976 against Birmingham City. In 1976, West Ham loaned him to the Hartford Bicentennials of the North American Soccer League. He returned on loan in 1977, but by that time the team had moved and was now known as the Connecticut Bicentennials.

He played for the Upton Park club for twelve years, gaining an FA Cup winners medal in 1980, a League Cup runners-up medal in 1981 and promotion back to the top tier, after finishing as Division Two champions in 1980–81. He amassed 372 appearances and 41 goals for West Ham in all competitions, until his departure in 1987.

He qualified for the UEFA Pro Licence in 2004.

Honours
Individual
PFA Team of the Year: 1987–88 Third Division

References

External links
 February 2006 Interview

1956 births
Living people
English footballers
People from Lower Clapton
Association football midfielders
West Ham United F.C. players
Connecticut Bicentennials players
English expatriate footballers
North American Soccer League (1968–1984) players
Notts County F.C. players
Leyton Orient F.C. players
Hendon F.C. players
English Football League players
English expatriate sportspeople in the United States
Expatriate soccer players in the United States
English football managers
Footballers from the London Borough of Hackney
FA Cup Final players